Carolyn Ray Boone Mahoney (born 1946) is an American mathematician who served as President of Lincoln University of Missouri. Her research interests include combinatorics, graph theory, and matroids.

Early life and education
Carolyn Mahoney was born the sixth of thirteen children in 1946 in Memphis, Tennessee to Stephen and Myrtle Boone. Her grandmother cared for the children while her mother worked. Mahoney attended Catholic schools, where she was encouraged in her interest in mathematics by the nuns. As a teenager, Mahoney's parents separated due to her father's drinking and gambling and the family was forced to move to a lower-class neighborhood.

Mahoney and her siblings were known for being smart in their neighborhood. She graduated from Father Bertrand High School in 1964.

Mahoney attended Mount St. Scholastica College, a Catholic, all-female college in Kansas for three years before finishing her degree in mathematics at Siena College in Memphis, Tennessee in 1970. She then earned her master's degree in mathematics in 1972 and a doctorate in 1983, both from Ohio State University. Her doctorate involved matroid theory and enumerative combinatorics, and was supervised by Thomas Allan Dowling. She was  the 25th black woman to earn a Ph.D. in mathematics in the U.S.

Career
After earning her doctorate, Mahoney taught first at Denison University from 1984 to 1989, and Ohio State for two years. She also served on the test development committee for the College Board from 1986 to 1989. In 1989, Mahoney was the first mathematician to be selected for the faculty at California State University San Marcos, and was one of twelve founding faculty of the San Marcos campus.

In 1994 and 1995, Mahoney served as a program director at the National Science Foundation, and she later worked as an administrator at Elizabeth City State University in North Carolina.
In 2005, Mahoney was named president of Lincoln University of Missouri. She retired in 2012.

Contributions
Mahoney's research has focused largely on open problems in graph theory and combinatorics. As well as her thesis work on matroids, she has also published research on the Hadwiger–Nelson problem concerning the chromatic number of unit distance graphs.

She believes that she has had a hard time finding collaborators due to the fact that she is a Black female in mathematics. She is also a proponent of educational reform, especially supporting cultural diversity in university faculty. She believes that through the efforts of organizations such as the Mathematical Association of America and the Association for Women in Mathematics the environment for women in mathematics has improved.

Awards and honors
In 1989, Mahoney was inducted into the Ohio Women's Hall of Fame.

A scholarship at CSU San Marcos and a walking trail at Lincoln University have been named in her honor.

Mahoney was also recognized by Mathematically Gifted & Black as a Black History Month 2018 Honoree.

References

1946 births
Living people
20th-century American mathematicians
21st-century American mathematicians
American women mathematicians
African-American mathematicians
Ohio State University Graduate School alumni
California State University San Marcos faculty
Elizabeth City State University faculty
Presidents of Lincoln University (Missouri)
Graph theorists
Mathematicians from Tennessee
20th-century women mathematicians
21st-century women mathematicians
African-American academics
Women heads of universities and colleges
American academic administrators
African-American educators
20th-century African-American women
20th-century African-American people
21st-century American women
21st-century African-American women
21st-century African-American people